The Macau Government Headquarters, formerly Governor's Palace is the official office of the Chief Executive of Macau and has been since 1999. It is located in São Lourenço.

History
Built in 1849 by Tomás de Aquino, architect, for Alexandrino Antonio de Melo, 1st Baron do Cercal, the two story pink facade structure is one of the historic properties preserving Portuguese influence in Macau and located on Avenida da Praia Grande, in the St. Lawrence Parish. The building used Pombaline style imported from Portugal and popular in the 18th to mid 19th Century. The office is the former residence of the Governor of Macau (relocated to another residence further west at Macau Government House) and the offices of the governor prior to the handover in 1999.

The building is surrounded by shops, residences and other office buildings. It is bounded by the roads Travessa Do Paiva, Avenida Dr Stanley Ho and Travessa do Padre Narciso. The northside is closed off by buildings.

The main entrance faces Avenida Dr Stanley Ho and looks out to Nam Van Lake with the Superior Court of Macau Building and Macau Legislative Assembly Building in the distance.

Interior

The Government Headquarters has three wings and has undergone several reincarnations. Most of the interior is updated with modern features, but some original features have remained. The headquarters houses the Lotus Room (conference room of the Executive Council), a multi-purpose conference room and a pressroom. While the edifice and interior architecture is distinctly European, the building contains many Chinese wooden furniture and attractive ceramics.

Exterior

A large garden with various plants, fountains and trees are found in the rear of the structure. The garden design is a mix of European and Chinese styles.

Open Day

Two days a year it is open to visitors to discover the interior and exterior of the government office.

References
 Government Headquarters to open to the public during the weekend, Government Information Bureau, 15 October, 2015 

Official residences
Landmarks in Macau
Government buildings in Macau
Government buildings completed in 1849
1849 establishments in China
1849 establishments in the Portuguese Empire
19th-century establishments in Macau
Portuguese colonial architecture in China